Lead poisoning epidemics refer to instances of mass lead poisoning, and usually occur unintentionally in low income countries. Lead recycling is a common cause of a poisoning epidemic, and it is commonplace and sometimes the only means of providing sustenance in poorer countries. The lack of immediate and obvious health effects often result in people taking excessive risks and few precautions when handling lead. These events can also cause disproportionate childhood fatalities, when levels of toxins become fatal in lower concentrations in children compared with adults.

Notable poisoning events

This list does not include episodes of fewer that 100 people affected, nor does it include individual lead paint poisoning cases, nor those caused by eating contaminated food or water. The cases below are discrete events of mass lead poisonings. 

number tested high is defined as a blood lead level greater than or equal to 10 micrograms per deciliter whole blood (ug/dl)

See also 
 List of man-made mass chronic poisoning incidents
 Lead contamination in Washington, D.C. drinking water
 Flint water crisis
 2009 Chinese lead poisoning scandal 
 Exide lead contamination from battery recycling in the U.S.
 Lead contamination in Oakland

References

Epidemics
Mass poisoning